Machadoia is a genus of moths in the family Erebidae. The genus was erected by Alfredo Rei do Régo Barros in 1956 and contains three species found in Ecuador and Brazil.

Species
Machadoia xanthosticta (Hampson, 1901)
Machadoia diminuta (Walker, 1855)
Machadoia extincta (Reich, 1935)

References

Phaegopterina
Moth genera